Little Orleans is an unincorporated community and census-designated place (CDP) in Allegany County, Maryland, United States. As of the 2010 census it had a population of 42.

Little Orleans is located on the Potomac River at the mouth of Fifteenmile Creek across from Orleans Cross Roads, West Virginia. Little Orleans was served by the Chesapeake & Ohio Canal, and by the Western Maryland Railway, both of which have been abandoned.  "Bill's Place", a restaurant and store, is located adjacent to the canal. An annual event hosted by Ken Appel, "Apple's East Coast Motorcycle Rally" (formerly East Coast Sturgis) attracts thousands of visitors every August to this otherwise sleepy little town.

Demographics

References

Census-designated places in Allegany County, Maryland
Census-designated places in Maryland
Maryland populated places on the Potomac River